Jamie Cunningham (born September 3, 1987) is an American soccer player who last played for the Puerto Rico Islanders in the North American Soccer League.

Career

College and amateur
Cunningham attended Pinnacle High School, before going on to play four years of college soccer at Fort Lewis College. After redshirting his rookie season in 2006, he played in 19 games in 2007, and went on to establishi himself as a key member of the Skyhawks defense. He was a Second team Daktronics All-American and a Daktronics All-Central Region first team selection as a junior in 2009, and was named to the RMAC All-Tournament Team in each of his years. Following his senior year in 2010 Cunningham won the Don Whalen Award as Fort Lewis's outstanding senior male athlete, was a Daktronics All-America honorable mention, was named to the NSCAA/Performance Subaru All-Central Region first team and the Daktronics All-Central Region first team. He finished his college career with 17 goals and 5 assists in 83 games.

During his college years Cunningham also played in the USL Premier Development League for the El Paso Patriots, Austin Aztex U23 and Victoria Highlanders.

Professional
Cunningham turned professional in 2011 when he signed a contract to play for the Puerto Rico Islanders of the North American Soccer League. He made his professional debut on April 29, 2011 in a game against the Fort Lauderdale Strikers, and scored his first professional goal in a 2011 CFU Club Championship game against Surinamese club Walking Bout Company on May 7, 2011.

Puerto Rico announced on December 27, 2011 that Cunningham would return for the 2012 season.

References

External links
 Fort Lewis bio

1987 births
Living people
American soccer players
American expatriate soccer players
Soccer players from Arizona
Fort Lewis Skyhawks men's soccer players
El Paso Patriots players
Austin Aztex U23 players
Victoria Highlanders players
Puerto Rico Islanders players
Expatriate footballers in Puerto Rico
USL League Two players
North American Soccer League players
Association football defenders